Following the 2022 Lebanese general election, 128 members of parliament were elected, including 68 incumbents and 7 women. The election marked significant gains for independent candidates of varying political persuasions and marked the first time since the 1992 Lebanese general election that the Future Movement did not participate.

See also 
 2022 Lebanese general election
 Members of the 2005–2009 Lebanese Parliament
 List of members of the 2009–2017 Lebanese Parliament
 List of members of the 2018-2022 Lebanese Parliament

References

Lists of members of the Parliament of Lebanon by term
Lebanon